The Omega War is a science fiction-themed board game published by TSR through its subsidiary Simulations Publications, Inc. (SPI) in 1983.

Description
The Omega War is a two-player game of strategic warfare for control of a post-apocalyptic North America.

Setting
Three hundred years after an atomic war devastated the nations of the earth, a rebuilt North America has been loosely organized into a series of clanholds and population reserves governed from the domed settlements of the World Union. But rebels wish to overturn the status quo.

Components
The game includes:
22" x 34" hex grid game map
200 diecut counters
32-page rulebook
two 6-sided dice (not included in the magazine edition)

Gameplay
The Rebels are pitted against the Union. Each turn is composed of twelve phases:
Union recruitment phase
Rebel political phase
 Rebel march phase
Rebel combat phase
Union reaction phase
Rebel exploitation phase
Union march phase
Rebel reaction phase
Union combat phase
Union exploitation phase
Rebel reinforcement phase
Game turn record phase

Victory conditions
There are three possible ways to win:
If the Political Index (PI) is greater than 45 at the start of a turn, then the revolution collapses and the Union player wins.
If the PI is less than 5 at the start of a turn, then the Rebel player wins.
If the game date reaches the end of November 2421, then victory is determined by the PI level: 30 or less indicates a Rebel victory, above 30 is a Union victory.

Publication history
In the early 1980s, SPI ran into financial difficulties and was taken over by TSR, which then used SPI as a subsidiary to release board wargames. The Omega War was one such product, a board game designed by David James Ritchie, with illustrations by Timothy Truman. It was originally published as a pull-out game in Issue 14 of Ares (Spring 1983), and was also released the same year as a boxed set.

Reception
In Issue 71 of Space Gamer (December 1984), Rick Swan was not impressed, writing "Not only is The Omega War too long and too dull, the stiff turn sequence and confusing graphics make it a chore to play. Too bad, because there are certainly enough ideas here for a decent game. As presented, The Omega War suffers from too much ambition and too little development."

Other reviews
Simulacrum #11

References

Board games introduced in 1983
Simulations Publications games